New Castle (historically spelled as one word; "Newcastle") is the only town in Craig County, Virginia, United States. The population was 125 at the 2020 census. It is the county seat of Craig County.

The junctions of State Route 311 and State Route 42 and State Route 311 and State Route 615 are in New Castle.

New Castle is part of the Roanoke Metropolitan Statistical Area.

Geography
New Castle is located at  (37.500746, -80.110798).

According to the United States Census Bureau, the town has a total area of 0.2 square miles (0.4 km2), all of it land.

Two notable geophysical features of the town are the high cliffs just west of the city (which keeps the New River watershed flowing north away from New Castle) and Johns Creek gorge featuring some challenging whitewater (James River watershed).  Due to an old land charter however, paddling Johns Creek was disputed as trespassing by the landowner, recent court rulings have opened the run up once again.

The town is just north of the Sinking Creek Valley Cluster, west of the Craig Creek Cluster, and south of the Barbours Creek-Shawvers Run Cluster; areas in the Jefferson National Forest designated by the Wilderness Society as containing "Mountain Treasures".

Demographics

As of the census of 2000, there were 179 people, 85 households, and 51 families living in the town. The population density was 1,105.0 people per square mile (432.0/km2). There were 93 housing units at an average density of 574.1 per square mile (224.4/km2). The racial makeup of the town was 100.00% White.

There were 85 households, out of which 23.5% had children under the age of 18 living with them, 47.1% were married couples living together, 10.6% had a female householder with no husband present, and 40.0% were non-families. 36.5% of all households were made up of individuals, and 9.4% had someone living alone who was 65 years of age or older. The average household size was 2.11 and the average family size was 2.73.

In the town, the population was spread out, with 22.9% under the age of 18, 12.3% from 18 to 24, 23.5% from 25 to 44, 25.1% from 45 to 64, and 16.2% who were 65 years of age or older. The median age was 37 years. For every 100 females there were 82.7 males. For every 100 females age 18 and over, there were 91.7 males.

The median income for a household in the town was $26,250, and the median income for a family was $35,750. Males had a median income of $25,625 versus $19,583 for females. The per capita income for the town was $14,119. About 20.4% of families and 17.2% of the population were below the poverty line, including 28.2% of those under the age of eighteen and 6.1% of those sixty-five or over.

Climate
The climate in this area is characterized by hot, humid summers and generally cold winters.

References

Towns in Craig County, Virginia
County seats in Virginia